Roger Panes (1933 – 4 March 1974) was a British member of the Exclusive branch of the Plymouth Brethren. In 1974 he killed his wife and three children with an axe before hanging himself.

Life 
Panes was a cattle dealer in Andover, Hampshire. In November 1973 he was "shut up," or shunned, by the other members of his church, for wrongfully shunning another member. This is a form of 'discipline' promulgated by James Taylor Jnr. and James Symington, leaders of the sect. His family were required to shun him and he was not allowed to sleep with his wife or eat with the family.

In February 1974, Panes was taken to hospital having taken an overdose of tablets, due to the stress of his situation. He recovered, but, on 4 March 1974, he killed his wife Pamela, 39, his two sons Graham, 7, and Adrian, 4, and his daughter Angela, 6, as they slept in their beds. An axe was found covered in blood. He then hanged himself from the stair bannisters with an electrical cable.

A note was also found in the house:

An inquest was held and a jury decided that Panes had killed his family while the "balance of his mind was disturbed."

See also 
 David Hendricks – member of the Exclusive Brethren convicted and then acquitted of murdering his wife and three children.

References

External links 
 Description of events

1933 births
1974 deaths
British mass murderers
British Plymouth Brethren
English murderers of children
Familicides
Mass murder in 1974
Suicides by hanging in England
Murder–suicides in the United Kingdom
Shunning
People from Andover, Hampshire